General elections were held in the Faroe Islands on 28 January 1936. The Union Party and the Self-Government Party emerged as the joint-largest parties in the Løgting, both winning 8 of the 24 seats.

Results

References

Elections in the Faroe Islands
Faroe Islands
1936 in the Faroe Islands
January 1936 events
Election and referendum articles with incomplete results